The Patty Berg Award is an award given by the LPGA to an individual who "exemplifies diplomacy, sportsmanship, goodwill and contributions to the game of golf." It was first awarded in 1979 and is named after LPGA co-founder and golfer Patty Berg.

Recipients

1979 Marilynn Smith
1980 Betsy Rawls
1981-83 No award
1984 Ray Volpe
1985 Dinah Shore
1986 David Foster
1987 Kathy Whitworth
1988 John D. Laupheimer
1989 No award
1990 Patty Berg
1991 Karsten Solheim
1992 Judy Dickinson
1993 Kerry Graham
1994 Charles S. Mechem Jr.
1995 No award
1996 Suzanne Jackson
1997 Judy Bell
1998 No award
1999 Judy Rankin
2000 Louise Suggs
2001 Pat Bradley
2002 Patty Sheehan
2003 Annika Sörenstam
2004 No award
2005 Ty Votaw
2006–2007 No award
2008 Dolores Hope
2009 Juli Inkster
2010–2011 No award
2012 Nancy Lopez
2013 Peggy Kirk Bell
2014 Tom Maletis
2015 Shirley Spork

External links
LPGA – Berg, Farr, Powell, and Zaharias Award Winners

Golf awards in the United States
LPGA Tour
Awards established in 1979
1979 establishments in the United States